Kunnisseri Veettil Raman Mani (1 January 1971 – 6 March 2016), better known by his stage name Kalabhavan Mani, was an Indian actor and singer. Mani started his career as a mimicry artist with the Kalabhavan comedy troupe.  He had starred in over 250 films, including Malayalam, Tamil, Kannada, and Telugu films, and was renowned for his humorous characters and villain roles.

Mani won the National Film Award – Special Jury Award and Kerala State Film Award for his performance as Ramu in Vasanthiyum Lakshmiyum Pinne Njaanum (1999).

Personal life 

Kalabhavan Mani was born as Kunnisseri Veettil Raman Mani in Kerala to Chenathunad Kunnisseri Veettil Raman and Ammini at Chalakudy, Thrissur District on  New Year's Day in 1971. He had an elder brother, Velayudan (deceased), younger brother, R. L. V. Ramakrishnan (dancer) and four sisters, Thankamani, Leela, Santha and Ammini Jr. He studied at GLPS East School Chalakudy till 4th grade and Government Boys School, Chalakudy till 10th grade.

Mani married Nimmy on 22 September 1999 and has a daughter named Sreelakshmi, born in 2000. He was once an autorickshaw driver from Chalakudy. His brother, R. L. V. Ramakrishnan acted in Bamboo Boys in a cameo role, starring alongside Cochin Haneefa, his brother, Harisree Ashokan and Salim Kumar.

Career 

He started his career as a  mimicry artist with the drama group Cochin Kalabhavan.His film debut was as a junior artist in Vijayakanth Captain Prabhakaran. He started his acting career in the Malayalam film Aksharam as an auto rickshaw driver. He got his first major breakthrough with the Lohithadas movie Sallapam (1996), which was a hit. After this, he acted in several movies in the comedy roles. He did some notable roles in movies such as Dilliwala Rajakumaran, Manthra Mothiram, Gajaraja Manthram, Katha Nayagan, Mayaponman and Kottappurathe Koottukudumbam. Mani's comic role as Monayi in the 1998 movie Summer in Bethlahem was appreciated among the audience. After portraying several comic characters, his true potential to do the character roles was revealed in the film Vasanthiyum Lakshmiyum Pinne Njaanum. He did the role of a blind singer in it which earned him the Special Jury Award at both National Film Awards and Kerala State Film Awards. These awards helped Mani to do the character roles and villain roles in several movies while also doing comedy roles in numerous films. In Vakkalathu Narayanankutty (2001), he played the villain role. However his performance as villain was first noted in the movie Rakshasa Rajavu (2001), where he played the role of a crooked corrupt politician called Gunasekharan. The Guard is unique film as it has only Mani as a star cast in it. His performance as a poor eccentric person called Kuttan in Karumadikuttan received high appreciation. Mani returned to his unique comical role with the Jayaram starrer One man show. Mani was praised for his performance in Valkannadi (2002). The revenge drama had Mani in the role of Appunni, a blacksmith with the history of mental illness. He was also noted for his performance in the character role in Malayali Mamanu Vanakkam. After the comedy movies Kuberan and Bamboo Boys, both of them released in 2002, Mani almost shifted his complete focus on doing character and villain roles. Mani's notable movies in 2003 include Vellithira, Balettan, Pattalam and War and Love. He once again returned to do the comedy role with the 2004 Priyadarshan screwball comedy movie Vettam, which is probabily his last notable movie in a complete comic role. He also had a small appearance in Magic Lamp. Mani's performance as Chemban Gurukkal, the blind master martial artist, in Ananthabhadam (2005) received high appreciation. In Ben Johnson, he played the role of an action hero for the first time. It was one of the highest-grossing movies in 2005. The success of Ben Johnson saw Mani playing the similar hero roles in movies such as Lokanathan IAS, Chacko Randaman, Kisan, Payum Puli, Red Salute etc. He got a  lot of praise for his performance as the villain in Chotta Mumbai (2007). In the movie, Mani played the character called Nateshan, which is considered one of the biggest villain characters in Malayalam. Mani played the lead role in the family drama Aayirathil Oruvan (2009), which was critically acclaimed In 2010, Mani acted in several films in the lead roles such as Orange, Pulliman, Black Stallion and Canvas. However, most of these were a huge failure at box office. In 2012, he acted in the multi-starrer crime drama film Bachelor Party. His performance as Looyi Papan in Amen (2013) was acclaimed by both the critics and audience. Mani's last Malayalam movie is Poyi Maranju Parayathe, which was released in 2016 after his death.

He grabbed everyone's attention in the Tamil film industry as the villain in the movie Gemini (2002), which featured Vikram in the lead role. He acted in more than 30 Tamil films along with numerous Kannada and Telugu films. His last Tamil film is Pudhusa Naan Poranthen released in 2016.

Along with his acting career, Mani established a parallel industry of Nadan Pattu (folk songs), by selling a record number of releases. His first music album was Kannimanga Prayathil. Most of his songs were written and composed by Arumugan Venkidangu. He also released several religious songs and Mappila Pattukal.

Charity
Mani is well known for providing humanitarian assistance to people in need. He was approached and was offered a seat in the 2016 Kerala Legislative Assembly election by LDF. He had openly told that he was a Leftist and used to Campaign for CPI(M) and left parties during elections. Mani is known for doing a lot of charity work for the poor people. Reportedly, on an average day, around 20 people from less privileged backgrounds used to come to visit him at his residence. As a fund-raiser and performer, he also had contributed money to the local festivals of the religious organisations and provided funds to the schools in his village.

Death 

Kalabhavan Mani died at 7:15 pm on 6 March 2016, aged 45. The day before, he was admitted to Amrita Hospital, Kochi, with haematemesis (vomiting of blood) and was in the ICU. The police registered a case as unnatural death due to the presence of excessive methyl alcohol (a toxic chemical found in illicitly distilled liquor, Arrack) with acetaminophen in Kalabhavan Mani's body.

On 8 March 2016, based on the initial autopsy report and statements of witnesses, the police said that serious alcoholic fatty liver illness along with alcohol consumption may have caused his death and it might have been a suicide attempt. Four months prior to his death, doctors had categorically warned him against drinking alcohol and he was counselled for severe depression. However, Mani in his phase of depression and informed of severe liver damage conditions, ignored the doctors' warnings and continued with alcoholism. Even on the day before he died, he was allegedly reported consuming alcohol (beer) with friends in the outhouse of his house.

His unexpected death led to a case by his friends and family which has been filed for investigation through Kochi City Police. On 18 March 2016, based on the forensic test from the Regional Chemical Examiner's Laboratory, death cause was identified with high probability a highly poisonous chemical, Chlorpyrifos—usually used in insecticides, which is banned in many countries for residential use, it is considered a hazardous substance for general ecology. Presence of chlorpyrifos along with methyl and ethyl alcohol contents were found excessively in the test samples. The report suggests that Mani might have consumed the poison knowingly or unknowingly over the days before his death. Therefore, the Government of Kerala has ordered a comprehensive probe in the death of Mani. The police is rounding the case through whom Mani could have accessed this poisonous concoction for substance abuse. Under RLV Ramakrishnan's suspicion Mani's three close friends have been taken into custody for questioning to rule out activities of vested interest. On 11 June 2016, based on the recommendation of the state DGP, the Government of Kerala has decided the case to be investigated by CBI. In May 2017 CBI took over the case and submitted FIR in which it was stated that the death of Kalabhavan Mani was due to unusual reasons.

His sudden demise led to emotional reactions from his fans and many of his co-stars in the Malayalam Film Industry along with the rest of the South Indian Film Industry. The Mollywood film fraternity and thousands of fans of late actor Kalabhavan Mani paid homage to the versatile artiste during a memorial service on 13 March 2016, at Carmel Higher Secondary School in Chalakudy organised by well-wishers. Tributes were celebrated through the media with 2–3 hours programme special. Mani was cremated with full state honours at his home premises on 7 March. The shopkeepers of Chalakudy paid homage to Mani by closing their shops on the same day.

Legacy
Chalakkudikkaran Changathi is a 2018 Malayalam film directed by Vinayan based on the life of Kalabhavan Mani.

Controversies 

In an interview with journalist John Brittas, Mani stated that the State Government Award could easily have been bought off.

On 14 May 2013, Mani has been accused of assaulting two forest officials during a routine inspection at Athirappilly. However, those who had claimed to be travelling with Mani in the same car, had filed a complaint against the forest officials for abusing them. The police have registered cases against both Mani and the injured forest officials. Later, Mani was arrested and charged when he surrendered to the police. He was granted bail by the High Court of Kerala with conditions on it. Mani and his friends had been on a trip to the tourist place when forest officials intervened and said they wanted to search his vehicle. It was alleged that the officials started having an argument with Mani, allegedly hit the actor, verbally assaulted his Other Backward Class caste and stated Kalabhavan Mani was a "Dalit" and misbehaved with his friends' wives on the car. T. P. Senkumar of then Kerala Police ADGP had said that Mani was unnecessarily harassed by the officials and the actual reason behind the assault case against Mani was that he belonged to a lower caste and that discrimination against the ordinary and lower class exists in the Kerala Police force. However, the High Court criticised ADGP regarding the statement. On the other hand, the officials had alleged that Mani was in a drunk condition and also a main accused in two other assault cases. During an interview at Kairali channel, Mani said that jealousy had caused the officials registering the false case against him and the police officer who beat him had a criminal background of four charges.

Awards and honours 
National Film Awards
 1999 – Special Jury Award – Vasantiyum Lakshmiyum Pinne Njanum

Kerala State Film Awards
 1999 – Special Jury Award – Vasantiyum Lakshmiyum Pinne Njanum

Filmfare Awards
 2002 – Best Villain (Tamil) – Gemini

Asianet Film Awards
 1999 – Best Actor Award – Vasantiyum Lakshmiyum Pinne Njanum
 2007 – Best Actor in a Villain Role – Chotta Mumbai

Vanitha awards
 2008 – Vanitha Chandrika Award for Best Actor in Villain Role– Chotta Mumbai

Jaihind TV awards
 2010 – Special Jury Award

Other awards
 2014 Bharat Gopi Foundation Award

Filmography

Malayalam films

2010s

2000s

1990s

Tamil films

Telugu films

Kannada films

As playback singer 
  Sammanam (1995)
  Kottaram Veettile Apputtan (1998)
  Kannezhuthi Pottum Thottu (1999)
  Vasanthiyum Lakshmiyum pinne njanum (1999)
  O Priye (2000)
  Achaneyanishttam (2001)
  Akasthile Paravakal (2001)
  The Guard (2001)
  Karumadikkuttan (2001)
  Bamboo Boys (2002)
  Kanmashi (2002)
  Vaalkannadi (2002)
  Kusruthy Kannan (2003)
  Kanninum Kannadiykkum (2004)
  Kazhcha (2004)
  Malsaram (2004)
  Ananthabhadram (2005)
  Ben Johnson (2005)
  Chacko Randaaman (2006)
  Kissan (2006)
  Red Salute (2006)
  Abraham Lincoln (2007)
  Evan (2007)
  Kabadi Kabadi (2008)
  Twenty Twenty (2010)
  Chakorandaman (2006)
  indrajith (2006)
  aandavan (2007)
  paayum puli (2007)

As music director

Story 
MLA Mani Pathaam Classum Gusthiyum (2012)

Television 
 Manimelam as host (Kairali TV)
Gajarajan Guruvayur Keshavan (Surya TV)
Meera (Asianet)
Vinodsala (Doordarshan)
Chiri Arangu (Doordarshan)

References

External links 

 
 http://en.msidb.org/displayProfile.php?category=actors&artist=Kalabhavan%20Mani&limit=186

1971 births
2016 deaths
Indian male film actors
Male actors from Thrissur
People from Chalakudy
Kerala State Film Award winners
Male actors in Malayalam cinema
International Tamil Film Award winners
Male actors in Tamil cinema
Malayalam playback singers
Singers from Kerala
20th-century Indian singers
21st-century Indian singers
20th-century Indian male actors
21st-century Indian male actors
Special Jury Award (feature film) National Film Award winners
Film musicians from Kerala
20th-century Indian male singers
21st-century Indian male singers
Male actors from Kerala
Male actors in Malayalam television